Walter Leland Catlett (February 4, 1889 – November 14, 1960) was an American actor and comedian. He made a career of playing excitable, meddlesome, temperamental, and officious blowhards.

Career
Catlett was born on February 4, 1889, in San Francisco, California.

He started out in vaudeville, teaming up with Hobart Cavanaugh at some point, with a detour for a while to opera, before breaking into acting.

He debuted on stage in 1906 and made his first Broadway appearance in either The Prince of Pilsen (1910 or 1911) or So Long Letty (1916). His first film appearance was in 1912, but then he went back to the stage and did not return to films until 1929. He performed in operettas and musicals, including The Ziegfeld Follies of 1917, the original production of the Jerome Kern musical Sally (1920) and the Gershwins' Lady, Be Good (1924). In the last, he introduced the song "Oh, Lady Be Good!" In 1918, he starred in, stage-managed and rewrote an Oliver Morosco-Elmer Harris-Harry Plani production titled Look Pleasant, playing at the Majestic Theatre in Los Angeles. His antics in the musical Baby Bunting in London in 1922 had King George V laughing "uproariously".

Catlett made a handful of silent film appearances, but his film career did not catch on until the advent of talking pictures allowed moviegoers to experience his full comic repertoire. He starred in a number of 'two-reelers', mostly in the Thirties, some as a comedy duo with Eugene Pallette, for RKO; most were for RKO, but six were for Columbia between 1934 and 1940.

Three of his better remembered roles were as the theatre manager driven to distraction by James Cagney's character in Yankee Doodle Dandy, the local constable who throws the entire cast in jail and winds up there himself in the Howard Hawks' classic screwball comedy Bringing Up Baby, and as Morrow, the drunken poet in the restaurant who "knows when [he's] been a skunk" and takes Longfellow Deeds on a "bender" in Mr. Deeds Goes to Town. He was also widely reported to have been Katharine Hepburn's comedy coach while filming Bringing Up Baby. The New York Times film critic Mordaunt Hall wrote that "This clever comedian runs away with the acting laurels" in Big City Blues (1932). He played John Barsad in the 1935 David O. Selznick production of A Tale of Two Cities, starring Ronald Colman. He also provided the uncredited voice of J. Worthington Foulfellow (a.k.a. Honest John) the Fox, one of the main villains in Walt Disney's 1940 animated film Pinocchio. In the 1950s, he appeared in films like Here Comes the Groom, Friendly Persuasion, and Beau James.

For his contributions to the film industry, Catlett was inducted into the Hollywood Walk of Fame on February 8, 1960, with a motion pictures star located at 1713 Vine Street.

Death
Catlett died of a stroke on November 14, 1960, in Woodland Hills, California, and was interred in Holy Cross Cemetery, Culver City, California.

Filmography

 Second Youth (1924) as John McNab
 Summer Bachelors (1926) as Bachelor No. 1
 The Music Master (1927) as Medicine Show Barker
 Why Leave Home? (1929) as Elmer
 Married in Hollywood (1929) as Joe Glitner
 Happy Days (1929) as End Man - Minstrel Show
 Let's Go Places (1930) as Rex Wardell
 The Big Party (1930) as Mr. Goldfarb
 The Golden Calf (1930) as Master of Ceremonies
 The Florodora Girl (1930) as De Boer
 The Front Page (1931) as Murphy
 Honeymoon Trio (1931 short) as The Nuisance
 One Quiet Night (1931 short) 
 Platinum Blonde (1931) as Bingy
 Maker of Men (1931) as McNeil
 Cock of the Air (1932) as Col. Wallace
 Sky Devils (1932) as Master of Ceremonies - Canteen Show (uncredited)
 The Expert (1932) as Al
 It's Tough to Be Famous (1932) as Joseph Craig 'Joe' Chapin
 Back Street (1932) as Bakeless
 Okay, America! (1932) as City Editor aka 'Lucille'
 Big City Blues (1932) as Cousin 'Gibby' Gibboney
 Rain (1932) as Quartermaster Bates
 The Sport Parade (1932) as 'Shifty' Morrison
 Rockabye (1932) as Jimmy Dunn
 Olsen's Big Moment (1933) as Robert Brewster III
 Private Jones (1933) as Spivey
 Private Wives (1933) Walter Catlett two-reeler, as Walter
 Hunting Trouble (1933) Walter Catlett two-reeler, as Walter
 Caliente Love (1933) Walter Catlett two-reeler, as Harrison
 Dream Stuff (1933) Walter Catlett two-reeler, as Cousin Walter
 Road Queen (1933) Walter Catlett two-reeler, as Walter Knox
 Daddy Knows Best (1933) Walter Catlett two-reeler, as Mr. Boyce
 Husbands' Reunion (1933) Walter Catlett two-reeler, as Walter
 The Big Fibber (1933) Walter Catlett two-reeler, as Walter Moore
 Meet The Champ (1933) Eugene Pallette and Walter Catlett two-reeler; as himself
 Sailors Beware (1933) Eugene Pallette and Walter Catlett two-reeler; as Smitty
 One Awful Night (1933) Eugene Pallette and Walter Catlett two-reeler; as himself
 So This Is Harris (1933, Oscar winner for Best Short Subject) Phil Harris three-reeler co-starring Walter Catlett as himself
 Mama Loves Papa (1933) as Tom Walker
 Arizona to Broadway (1933) as Ned Flynn
 Only Yesterday (1933) as Barnes (uncredited)
 Gold Nuggets (1933) Walter Catlett two-reeler; as himself
 Elmer Steps Out (1934. Columbia) Walter Catlett two-reeler; as Elmer
 Get Along Little Hubby (1934, Columbia) Walter Catlett two-reeler; as Elmer Tuttle
 The New Dealers (1934) Eugene Pallette and Walter Catlett two-reeler; as himself
 News Hounds (1934) Eugene Pallette and Walter Catlett two-reeler; as himself
 Making the Rounds (1934) Eugene Pallette and Walter Catlett two-reeler; as himself
 The Fuller Gush Man (1934) Walter Catlett two-reeler; as Harry Judson
 Old Maid's Mistake (1934) Walter Catlett two-reeler; as himself
 Unknown Blonde (1934) as Publicity Man
 The Captain Hates the Sea (1934) as Joe Silvers
 Lightning Strikes Twice (1934) as Gus
 Every Night at Eight (1935) as Master of Ceremonies
 The Affair of Susan (1935) as Gilbert
 In the Sweet Bye and Bye (1935) Walter Catlett two-reeler; as Elmer
 A Tale of Two Cities (1935) as Barsad
 Mr. Deeds Goes to Town (1936) as Morrow, the Poet
 We Went to College (1936) as Senator Budger
 Follow Your Heart (1936) as Joe Sheldon
 Cain and Mabel (1936) as Jake Sherman
 Four Days' Wonder (1936) as Duffy
 Banjo on My Knee (1936) as Warfield Scott
 Sing Me a Love Song (1936) as Mr. Sprague (uncredited)
 I Loved a Soldier (1936)
 Fibbing Fibbers (1936, Columbia) Walter Catlett two-reeler; as himself
 Upper Cutlets (1936, aka Uppercutlets) Walter Catlett two-reeler; as himself
 On the Avenue (1937) as Jake Dibble
 Love Is News (1937) as Eddie Johnson
 Wake Up and Live (1937) as Gus Avery
 Love Under Fire (1937) as Tip Conway
 Varsity Show (1937) as Professor Sylvester Biddle
 Danger – Love at Work (1937) as Uncle Alan
 Every Day's a Holiday (1937) as Nifty Bailey
 Come Up Riches (1937)
 Bringing Up Baby (1938) as Slocum
 Zaza (1938) as Marlardot
 Going Places (1938) as Franklin Dexter
 Exile Express (1939) as Gus
 Kid Nightingale (1939) as Skip Davis
 Static in the Attic (1939, Columbia) Walter Catlett two-reeler; as himself
 Pinocchio (1940) as Honest John Worthington Foulfellow (uncredited voice)
 Half a Sinner (1940) as Station Attendant
 Pop Always Pays (1940) as Tommy Lane
 Comin' Round the Mountain (1940) as W.P.A. Clerk
 Spring Parade (1940) as Headwaiter
 The Quarterback (1940) as Tom
 Li'l Abner (1940) as Barber
 You're Next! (1940) Walter Catlett two-reeler; as Slocum
 Alex In Wonderland (1940) Walter Catlett two-reeler; as Fred
 Blondes and Blunders (1940) Walter Catlett two-reeler; as himself
 Remedy for Riches (1940) as Clem
 Honeymoon for Three (1941) as Waiter
 The Wild Man of Borneo (1941) as 'Doc' Skelby
 You're the One (1941) as Program Director
 Horror Island (1941) as Sergeant McGoon
 Million Dollar Baby (1941) as Mr. Simpson
 Hello, Sucker (1941) as G. Remington 'Max' Conway
 Bad Men of Missouri (1941) as Mr. Pettibone
 Manpower (1941) as Sidney Whipple
 Unfinished Business (1941) as Billy Ross
 Sing Another Chorus (1941) as Theodore Gateson
 It Started with Eve (1941) as Doctor Harvey
 Steel Against the Sky (1941) as Professor Rupert Sampson
 Wild Bill Hickok Rides (1942) as Sylvester W. Twigg
 Star Spangled Rhythm (1942) as Walter
 My Gal Sal (1942) as Col. Truckee
 Syncopation (1942) as Spelvin
 Yankee Doodle Dandy (1942) as Theatre Manager
 Maisie Gets Her Man (1942) as Jasper
 Give Out, Sisters (1942) as Gribble
 Between Us Girls (1942) as Desk Sergeant
 Heart of the Golden West (1942) as Colonel Silas Popen
 How's About It (1943) as Whipple
 They Got Me Covered (1943) as Hotel Manager
 Hit Parade of 1943 (1943) as J. MacClellan Davis
 Cowboy in Manhattan (1943) as Ace Robbins
 Get Going (1943) as Horace Doblem
 The West Side Kid (1943) as Ramsey Fensel
 Fired Wife (1943) as Judge Allen
 His Butler's Sister (1943) as Mortimer Kalb
 Up in Arms (1944) as Major Brock
 Hat Check Honey (1944) as Tim Martel
 Her Primitive Man (1944) as Hotel Clerk
 Lady, Let's Dance (1944) as Timber Applegate
 Pardon My Rhythm (1944) as O'Bannion
 Ghost Catchers (1944) as Colonel Breckinridge Marshall
 Three Is a Family (1944) as Barney Meeker
 My Gal Loves Music (1944) as Dr. Bilbo
 Hi, Beautiful (1944) as Gerald Bisbee
 Lake Placid Serenade (1944) as Carlton Webb
 The Man Who Walked Alone (1945) as Wiggins
 I Love a Bandleader (1945) as B. Templeton James
 Riverboat Rhythm (1946) as Colonel Jeffrey "Smitty" Witherspoon
 Slightly Scandalous (1946) as Mr. Wright
 I'll Be Yours (1947) as Mr. Buckingham
 Are You with It? (1948) as Jason (Pop) Carter
 Mr. Reckless (1948) as Joel Hawkins
 The Boy with Green Hair (1948) as The King
 Henry, the Rainmaker (1949) as Mayor Colton
 Leave It to Henry (1949) as Mayor Colton
 Look for the Silver Lining (1949) as himself
 Dancing in the Dark (1949) as Joe Brooks
 The Inspector General (1949) as Colonel Castine
 Father Makes Good (1950) as Mayor George Colton
 Father's Wild Game (1950) as Mayor George Colton
 Father Takes the Air (1951) as Mayor George Colton
 Here Comes the Groom (1951) as Mr. McGonigle
 Honeychile (1951) as Al Moore
 Davy Crockett and the River Pirates (1956) as Colonel Plug (archive footage)
 Friendly Persuasion (1956) as Professor Quigley
 The Gay Nineties (1956)
 Beau James (1957) as Gov. Alfred E. "Al" Smith

Broadway stage credits
 So Long Letty (1916–1917)
 Ziegfeld Follies of 1917 (1917)
 Follow the Girl (1918)
 Sally (1920–1922, 1923)
 Dear Sir (1924)
 Lady, Be Good (1924–1925)
 Lucky (1927)
 ''Treasure Girl (1928)

References

External links

1889 births
1960 deaths
20th-century American male actors
American male film actors
American male silent film actors
American male stage actors
American male voice actors
Male actors from San Francisco
Vaudeville performers